Elaphrus lapponicus is a species of ground beetle in the subfamily Elaphrinae. It was described by Gyllenhal in 1810.

References

Elaphrinae
Beetles described in 1810